Steven Simon is a former United States National Security Council senior director for the Middle East and North Africa. He also previously served as the Executive Director IISS-US and Corresponding Director IISS-Middle East  and as a Senior Fellow at the Middle East Institute based in Washington, D.C. He was Hasib J. Sabbagh Senior Fellow for Middle Eastern Studies, at the Council on Foreign Relations.
He was a Spring 2008 Berlin Prize Fellow. Steven Simon is now a visiting professor at Colby College in Maine.

Education 
Simon holds a BA in Classics and Near Eastern Languages from Columbia University, an MTS from Harvard Divinity School, and an MPA from Princeton University.

Career 
In 1999 Steven Simon moved to Britain, where he worked as Deputy Director of the International Institute for Strategic Studies (IISS). Before he moved to London, Simon was Director for Global Issues and Senior Director for Transnational Threats at the White House. After Simon left the IISS he specialized in Middle Eastern affairs at the RAND Corporation, before he became a Senior Fellow for Middle Eastern Studies at the Council of Foreign Relations (CFR).

He was an International Affairs Fellow at Oxford University and a University Fellow at Brown University.

Works
"The Price of the Surge", Foreign Affairs, May/June 2008
"Can the Right War Be Won?", Foreign Affairs, July/August 2009

"America's Great Satan", Foreign Affairs, November/December 2019 (with Daniel Benjamin)
Books
Daniel Benjamin, Steven Simon, The Age of Sacred Terror. Radical Islam's War Against America, Random House, New York 2002,

References

External links
http://www.foreignaffairs.com/author/steven-simon
http://www.npr.org/books/authors/138377308/steven-simon

United States National Security Council staffers
Living people
Jewish American government officials
Year of birth missing (living people)
Colby College faculty
Princeton School of Public and International Affairs alumni
Harvard Divinity School alumni
Columbia College (New York) alumni
21st-century American Jews